Garrison Creek is a stream in McLean County, North Dakota, in the United States.

Garrison Creek was so named on account of soldiers being garrisoned there. The creek lent its name to the city of Garrison, North Dakota.

See also
List of rivers of North Dakota

References

Rivers of McLean County, North Dakota
Rivers of North Dakota